The 1928 United States Senate election in Maine was held on September 10, 1928. 

Incumbent Republican Senator Frederick Hale was re-elected to a third term in office, defeating Governor Owen Brewster in the primary. Hale won the general election in a landslide.

Republican primary

Candidates
 Frederick Hale, incumbent Senator since 1917
Owen Brewster, Governor of Maine

Results

Democratic primary

Candidates
 Herbert E. Holmes

Results
Holmes was unopposed in the Democratic primary.

General election

Results

See also 
 1928 United States Senate elections

References 

1928
Maine
United States Senate